Lee Anthony Warren (born 28 February 1969) is an English footballer who played as a defender and midfielder.

He started his career as a trainee for Leeds United before moving onto Rochdale and then Hull City where he spent some time on loan to Lincoln City.

Warren then went to Doncaster Rovers where he played during the ill-fated 1997–98 season in which they were relegated but went on to win the supporters' player of the year award in both that season and the following season in the Conference.

At the end of the 1999–2000 season he moved to Barrow with a couple of other Doncaster players. He was appointed assistant manager to Lee Turnbull there in April 2003 until he left in 2005.

He later played for Goole, Brigg Town, Stocksbridge Park Steels and AFC Blackburn Leisure.

References

External links
 
 
 doncasterrovers.co.uk profile
 On Cloud Seven (Brigg Town) profile

1969 births
Living people
Footballers from Manchester
English footballers
Leeds United F.C. players
Rochdale A.F.C. players
Hull City A.F.C. players
Lincoln City F.C. players
Doncaster Rovers F.C. players
Barrow A.F.C. players
Stocksbridge Park Steels F.C. players
Brigg Town F.C. players
Goole A.F.C. players
English Football League players
Association football defenders
Association football midfielders